The Santander 30 is a British sailboat that was designed by American William H. Tripp Jr. as a racer-cruiser and first built in 1966.

The design is a development of the Tripp 30, which was built by Mechans Ltd in the United Kingdom and by Werkspoor in the Netherlands starting in 1963, with 30 boats completed. Seafarer Yachts also imported the Tripp 30 into the United States.

Production
The Santander 30 design was built by Dock Plastics in the United Kingdom, starting in 1966, when the Tripp 30 moulds were moved from the Netherlands.

Design
The Santander 30 is a recreational keelboat, built predominantly of fibreglass, with wood trim. It has a masthead sloop rig. The hull has a spooned raked stem; a raised counter, angled, transom; a keel-mounted rudder controlled by a tiller and a fixed modified long keel. It displaces  and carries  of ballast.

See also
List of sailing boat types

References

Keelboats
1960s sailboat type designs
Sailing yachts
Sailboat type designs by American designers
Sailboat types built by Dock Plastics